Niaz Diasamidze (born 13 June 1973) is a Georgian musician, singer, songwriter, calligrapher and actor, best known as the lead vocalist and a founder member of 33a.

Niaz was born in Tbilisi, the capital of then-Soviet Georgia. In 1994 he founded folk and pop rock band 33a, name of band comes from the address – 33a, Paliashvili street, where Diasamidze lives.

Filmography

As composer
 2014 Tiflisi (TV Series) (original music by)
 2014 Tbilisi, I Love You 
 2013 Tangerines 
 2012 Bolo Gaseirneba
 2011 Guli + 
 2009 Tbilisuri Love Story 
 2009 The Conflict Zone (original music by)
 2008 Utsnobi jariskatsebi (Documentary) 
 2007 Subordinacia 
 2005 Tbilisi-Tbilisi
 1997 Otsnebebis sasaplao 
 1995 Atu – Alaba (Otel Kalipornia) (Short)

As actor
 1987 Pesvebi – Roots

External links 
 
 Niaz Diasamidze at the Geocinema.ge

1973 births
Composers from Georgia (country)
21st-century male singers from Georgia (country)
Recipients of the Presidential Order of Excellence
Rock musicians from Georgia (country)
Musicians from Tbilisi
French-language singers
Living people
Calligraphers from Georgia (country)
20th-century male singers from Georgia (country)
20th-century composers
21st-century composers